George Wynne Jeudwine  was an eminent Anglican priest in the first third of the twentieth century.

Born on 12 April 1849, he was educated at Bradfield College and Corpus Christi College, Oxford. He was elected a Fellow of The Queen's College, Oxford in 1870;  and ordained in 1872. He was Vicar of Upton Grey from 1875 to 1884; and then Rector of Niton from then until 1889.  He was Rector of Harlaxton from 1889 to 1913 (and Archdeacon of Stow from 1912 to 1913). He was Archdeacon of Lincoln from 1913 to 1925; and Sub-Dean of Lincoln Cathedral from then until his death on 18 October 1933.

Notes

1849 births
People educated at Bradfield College
Alumni of Corpus Christi College, Oxford
Fellows of The Queen's College, Oxford
Archdeacons of Stow
Archdeacons of Lincoln
1933 deaths